Keep It To Yourself is the debut album by MullMuzzler (a band formed by Dream Theater lead singer James LaBrie). It was released on August 24, 1999.

Track listing

Personnel
James LaBrie - lead and backing vocals
Mike Keneally - guitars
Matt Guillory - keyboards, piano
Mike Mangini - drums
Bryan Beller - bass
Trent Gardner - trombone, keyboards, programming, spoken word
Wayne Gardner - horns
Michael Stewart - trumpet, alto sax

Production
Produced by James LaBrie
Engineered and mixed by Terry Brown

References

External links
Keep It to Yourself on Magna Carta Records' website (archived May 6, 2003)

1999 debut albums
MullMuzzler albums
Magna Carta Records albums
Albums with cover art by Dave McKean